

Key

Substitute appearances are included in the League apps column.
Years indicate date of first and last Accrington Stanley appearance.

List of players

References

Players
 
Association football player non-biographical articles
Accrington